In computational number theory, the Lucas test is a primality test for a natural number n; it requires that the prime factors of n − 1 be already known. It is the basis of the Pratt certificate that gives a concise verification that n is prime.

Concepts
Let n be a positive integer.  If  there exists an integer a, 1 < a < n, such that

and for every prime factor q of n − 1

then n is prime. If no such number a exists, then n is either 1, 2, or composite.

The reason for the correctness of this claim is as follows: if the first equivalence holds for a, we can deduce that a and n are coprime. If a also survives the second step, then the order of a in the group (Z/nZ)* is equal to n−1, which means that the order of that group  is n−1 (because the order of every element of a group divides the order of the group), implying that n is prime. Conversely, if n is prime, then there exists a primitive root modulo n, or generator of the group (Z/nZ)*. Such a generator has order |(Z/nZ)*| = n−1 and both equivalences will hold for any such primitive root.

Note that if there exists an a < n such that the first equivalence fails, a is called a Fermat witness for the compositeness of n.

Example
For example, take n = 71. Then n − 1 = 70 and the prime factors of 70 are 2, 5 and 7.
We randomly select an a=17 < n. Now we compute:

For all integers a it is known that

Therefore, the multiplicative order of 17 (mod 71) is not necessarily 70 because some factor of 70 may also work above. So check 70 divided by its prime factors:

Unfortunately, we get that 1710≡1 (mod 71). So we still don't know if 71 is prime or not.

We try another random a, this time choosing a = 11. Now we compute:

Again, this does not show that the multiplicative order of 11 (mod 71) is 70 because some factor of 70 may also work. So check 70 divided by its prime factors:

So the multiplicative order of 11 (mod 71) is 70, and thus 71 is prime.

(To carry out these modular exponentiations, one could use a fast exponentiation algorithm like binary or addition-chain exponentiation).

Algorithm
The algorithm can be written in pseudocode as follows:

 algorithm lucas_primality_test is
     input: n > 2, an odd integer to be tested for primality.
            k, a parameter that determines the accuracy of the test.
     output: prime if n is prime, otherwise composite or possibly composite.
 
     determine the prime factors of n−1.
 
     LOOP1: repeat k times:
         pick a randomly in the range [2, n − 1]
             
                 return composite
             else 
                 LOOP2: for all prime factors q of n−1:
                     
                         if we checked this equality for all prime factors of n−1 then
                             return prime
                         else
                             continue LOOP2
                     else 
                         continue LOOP1
 
     return possibly composite.

See also 
 Édouard Lucas, for whom this test is named
 Fermat's little theorem
 Pocklington primality test, an improved version of this test which only requires a partial factorization of n − 1
 Primality certificate

Notes

Primality tests